Big River Airport  is located near to Big River, Saskatchewan, Canada.

See also
List of airports in Saskatchewan

References

Registered aerodromes in Saskatchewan
Big River No. 555, Saskatchewan